The 2020–21 Austin Peay Governors basketball team represented Austin Peay State University in the 2020–21 NCAA Division I men's basketball season. The Governors, led by fourth-year head coach Matt Figger, played their home games at the Dunn Center in Clarksville, Tennessee as members of the Ohio Valley Conference.

Previous season
The Governors finished the 2019–20 season 21–12, 14–4 in OVC play to finish in third place. They defeated Eastern Illinois in the quarterfinals of the OVC tournament to advance to the semifinals, where they lost to Murray State. With 21 wins, they were a candidate for postseason play. However, all postseason tournaments were cancelled amid the COVID-19 pandemic.

Roster

Schedule and results 

|-
!colspan=12 style=| Regular season

|-
!colspan=12 style=| OVC tournament
|-

|-

Source

References

Austin Peay Governors men's basketball seasons
Austin Peay Governors
Austin Peay Governors basketball
Austin Peay Governors basketball